Cameo Kirby can refer to:

 Cameo Kirby (play), a 1909 Broadway play written by Booth Tarkington and Harry Leon Wilson, or its three screen adaptations: 
 Cameo Kirby (1914 film), a 1914 silent American film
 Cameo Kirby (1923 film), a 1923 silent American film
 Cameo Kirby (1930 film), a talkie by Fox Film Corporation